Arnvid Vasbotten (11 August 1903 – 17 May 1985) was a Norwegian jurist and politician for Nasjonal Samling. He was born in Florø and was educated as jurist. From November 1944, he succeeded Albert Viljam Hagelin as Minister of the Interior in the Quisling regime, the puppet government headed by Vidkun Quisling during the German occupation of Norway. Vasbotten was sentenced to twenty years forced labour in the legal purge in Norway after World War II.

References

1903 births
1985 deaths
People from Flora, Norway
Norwegian jurists
Members of Nasjonal Samling
Government ministers of Norway
People convicted of treason for Nazi Germany against Norway
Norwegian prisoners and detainees